Bridgeport Music is a music publishing company founded in Michigan by Armen Boladian in 1969. It controls the copyrights to recordings by George Clinton and Funkadelic. Bridgeport Music has filed lawsuits for copyright infringement via sampling against hundreds of defendants under the federal copyright statute, 17 U.S.C., leading to them to being often described as a "Sample troll". Among others, Bridgeport has sued for sampling infringements in popular music produced by Public Enemy, N.W.A, Jay-Z and The Notorious B.I.G. - a case in which the jury awarded Bridgeport more than $4 million in damages.

Notable court cases
On May 4, 2001 in Bridgeport Music, Inc. v. 11C Music, 202 F.R.D. 229' (M.D. Tenn 2001), Bridgeport Music filed a lawsuit alleging infringement of its copyrights in several sound recordings and musical compositions through sampling. It was seeking declaratory judgement, injunctive relief, and damages in around 500 different claims against approximately 800 defendants. The court decided that these cases should all be tried separately, which resulted in 477 individual cases. Notable cases include:

 Bridgeport Music, Inc. v. Dimension Films
 Pharrell Williams v. Bridgeport Music
 Bridgeport Music, Inc. v. Smith
 Bridgeport Music, Inc. v. Universal-Mca Music Publishing, Inc.
 Bridgeport Music, Inc. v. Still N the Water Publishing
 Bridgeport Music, Inc. v. Dm Records, Inc.
 Bridgeport Music, Inc. v. Justin Combs Publishing

Controversy over rights
There has been some controversy over the rights of the George Clinton and Funkadelic catalogs. Clinton himself has claimed that the rights to the musical works were obtained fraudulently, by using a forged document from 1983 dealing with the transfer of the Malbiz catalog of songs.

See also 
 Bridgeport Music, Inc. v. Dimension Films

References

External links
 Official Website

Music publishing companies of the United States
Publishing companies established in 1969
Companies based in Michigan